Bill Keith may refer to:

 Bill Keith (artist) (1929–2004), painter, photographer and visual poet
 Bill Keith (musician) (1939–2015), banjo player and innovator of the "melodic style" of banjo playing
 William H. Keith, Jr. (born 1950), action/adventure and military science fiction author

See also

 William Keith (disambiguation)
 
 Keith (disambiguation)
 Bill (disambiguation)